Garsellakopf is a mountain on the border of Liechtenstein and Austria in the Rätikon range of the Eastern Alps to the east of the town of Schaan, with a height of .

References
 
 

Mountains of the Alps
Mountains of Liechtenstein
Austria–Liechtenstein border
International mountains of Europe